"Big City Life" is a song by English electronic music duo Mattafix. With a chorus is sung in Jamaican Patois, "Big City Life" was released in August 2005 as the second single from Mattafix's debut album, Signs of a Struggle (2005). The single topped the charts in Austria, Germany, Italy, New Zealand, and Switzerland, and it peaked at number 15 in the duo's native United Kingdom. The song's music video was directed by Scott Franklin.

Track listings

UK CD1
 "Big City Life"
 "Big City Life" (Cutfather & Joe)

UK CD2
 "Big City Life" – 3:57
 "Big City Life" (Cutfather & Joe) – 3:55
 "Big City Life" (video) – 3:57

European 7-inch single
A. "Big City Life" (Sly and Robbie) – 3:56
B. "Big City Life" (Mattafix mix) – 6:11

European 12-inch single
A1. "Big City Life" (Solid Groove)
A2. "Big City Life" (Cutfather & Joe)
B1. "Big City Life" (Mattafix mix)
B2. "Big City Life" (Sly and Robbie)

European maxi-CD single
 "Big City Life"
 "Big City Life" (Cutfather & Joe)
 "Big City Life" (Solid Groove)
 "Big City Life" (Mattafix Mix)
 "Big City Life" (video)

Australian CD single
 "Big City Life"
 "Big City Life" (Cutfather & Joe)
 "Big City Life" (Solid Groove)
 "Big City Life" (Mattafix mix)

Personnel
Personnel are lifted from the Signs of a Struggle album booklet.
 Mattafix – instruments, production
 Marlon Roudette – writing, vocals
 Preetesh Hirji – writing
 Steve Dubb – additional production and mix
 Segs – additional production and mix

Charts

Weekly charts

Year-end charts

Decade-end charts

Certifications

Release history

Luude version

In 2022, Australian producer Luude was approached by Mattafix to remix "Big City Life" as a drum and bass track. The song was released on 17 June 2022 and reached the top 10 on the Official New Zealand Singles Chart.

Weekly charts

Year-end charts

Certifications

References

2005 singles
2005 songs
Number-one singles in Austria
Number-one singles in Germany
Number-one singles in Italy
Number-one singles in New Zealand
Number-one singles in Switzerland
Songs written by Marlon Roudette
Mattafix songs